The Parable of the Olive Tree is an extended allegory recounted in Chapter 5 of the Book of Jacob, the third book of the Book of Mormon. Jacob states the allegory was one of the teachings of Zenos found in the brass plates, a lost record. Latter Day Saints suggest that it is possible that Paul in his Epistle to the Romans is referencing a similar parable.

The Parable
The master of a vineyard grew a tame olive tree. But in time it grew old and began to decay. In hopes of saving it he pruned it, dug the ground and nourished it. In time some new branches appeared, but the top of the tree began to perish. So the master of the vineyard instructed his servant to cut off the decayed branches, and replace them with grafts of wild olives. Meanwhile, natural branches of the tree were transplanted to other parts of the vineyard. In time the original tree, now with wild olive branches grafted onto it, grew to give good fruit. Those natural branches of the original tree that were transplanted into poor soil also grew to give good fruit. However, a natural branch of the original tree that was transplanted into good soil grew to give a mix of good and poor fruit. The master of the vineyard instructed his servant to cut off the branches of this tree that gave poor fruit, and burn them. However, the servant suggested to that master that with further care this tree too might bring forth good fruit. And so the master and his servant worked diligently at nourishing all the trees.

After a long time the servant and servant returned to the vineyard, and found that all trees, both the original and the transplants, had failed, and had all grown only poor fruit. Bitterly disappointed, "the Lord of the vineyard wept, and said unto the servant: What could I have done more for my vineyard?" (Jacob 5:41). The master determined to burn all the trees in the vineyard, since all had given only evil fruit. Again the servant begged for clemency, and the master was persuaded, being reluctant to lose the vineyard he loved so much. The master decided to cut out those branches of wild olives that he had grafted onto the original tree that gave the most bitter fruit, and replace them with branches from the daughter trees that had grown from the previously transplanted cuttings. The master hoped that by bringing the branches and roots of the original tree back together, they would grow good fruit.

The master and his servants worked hard in the vineyard. They cut out the branches that brought forth evil fruit and burnt them, and pruned and nourished the trees, and dug the ground. After much hard work, there was no longer any bad fruit in the vineyard. "And it came to pass that when the Lord of the vineyard saw that his fruit was good, and that his vineyard was no more corrupt, he called up his servants, and said unto them: Behold, for this last time have we nourished my vineyard; and thou beholdest that I have done according to my will; and I have preserved the natural fruit, that it is good, even like as it was in the beginning. And blessed art thou; for because ye have been diligent in laboring with me in my vineyard, and have kept my commandments, and have brought unto me again the natural fruit, that my vineyard is no more corrupted, and the bad is cast away, behold ye shall have joy with me because of the fruit of my vineyard."

The parable ends with a warning from the master of the vineyard that the next time the vineyard grows poor fruit, he will gather the good and bad fruit and separate them, preserving only the good and casting away the bad. He will then cause the vineyard to be burned with fire.

Interpretation of the Parable

As with many other stories and parables, the parable of the olive tree can be interpreted as a commentary on life in general.  However, in context, the parable is an allegory of Israel's relationship with Jesus over thousands of years of history.  The lord of the vineyard is Jesus, the vineyard is the world, the olive branches are groups or families of people, and the olive fruits are the lives and works of men.  

The original tree appears to represent the nation of Israel and its roots the pure Gospel.  The wild olive branches grafted in to the original tree represent the preaching of the Gospel of Christ to Gentile nations and their conversion or baptism into the Church of Christ.  The transplanted branches represent scattered Israel including the House of Lehi in the New World giving rise to both good and bad fruits.  The good fruits might refer to the Nephites and poor fruits to the Lamanites considering that the Nephites were typically followers of Christ and the Lamanites typically not.  Although notice that the bad fruits are burned in the end, which might correspond to the destruction of the Nephite nation.  (The Lamanite nation was not destroyed.)  The bringing of the branches and roots back together represent the gathering of all the scattered tribes of Israel back into fellowship in Israel or Christ's church.

References

Jacob 5
Jacob 6

Further reading

Olive Tree
Book of Mormon
Olives